Jean Richer (1630–1696) was a French astronomer and assistant (élève astronome) at the French Academy of Sciences, under the direction of Giovanni Domenico Cassini.

Between 1671 and 1673 he performed experiments and carried out celestial observations in Cayenne, French Guiana, at the request of the French Academy. His observations and measurements of Mars during its perihelic opposition, coupled with those made simultaneously in Paris by Cassini, led to the earliest data-based estimate of the distance between Earth and Mars, which they then used to calculate the distance between the Sun and Earth (the astronomical unit).

While there he also measured the length of a seconds pendulum, that is a pendulum with a half-swing of one second, and found it to be 1.25 lignes (2.8 millimeters*) shorter than at Paris.    His method was to compare the oscillation of a freely decaying pendulum with the time kept by another mechanical clock and astronomical observations.   Isaac Newton later commented that if, as he had proposed, the force of gravity decreases with the inverse square of the distance between objects, the obvious conclusion to be drawn from Richer's work is that near-equatorial Cayenne is further from the centre of the earth than Paris, where the first such measurements had been taken.   Thus the earth could not be spherical, as had earlier been presumed, but rather bulges at and near the equator (Equatorial bulge).   It could be said that Richer was the first person to observe a change in gravitational force over the surface of the earth, beginning the science of gravimetry.

Richer's 1673 return to Paris was duly celebrated, and when his data were reproduced, the findings for which we remember him could be made public.   However, publication was delayed, for unknown causes, until 1679, when a work entitled  Observations Astronomiques et Physiques Faites en L'Isle de Caïenne par M. Richer, de l'Académie Royale des Sciences, was released under Richer's name. Not long thereafter, he was assigned to an engineering project in Germany.  The remainder of his life is undocumented.   Most biographers believe that he died at Paris in 1696.

note: To obtain the relative difference in the pendulum's frequency from this number, note that Richer gives the Paris pendulum's length as 3 feet 8 lines and 1/3. Since a line is 1/12th of an inch, the 1 line and a quarter discrepancy is a 0.284% difference in length, and thus a 0.142% difference in frequency, in fair agreement with Newton's claim of a 2 and a half minutes per day difference.

See also 
Seconds pendulum

References

External links
 Jean Richer at MacTutor History of Mathematics archive
 http://galileo.rice.edu/Catalog/NewFiles/richer.html

1630 births
1696 deaths
17th-century French astronomers